Breona may refer to:

Breona, Tasmania,  rural locality in Australia
Couronne de Bréona,  mountain of the Pennine Alps in Switzerland

See also
Breonna Taylor, African-American fatally shot by police
Brianna (disambiguation)